Society of Justice Party is a political party in Cambodia, whose president is Ban Sophal.

Political ideology
It believes in making the Cambodian people “confident in their national currency”, respecting Cambodia’s “constitution”,  believes in the monarchy and the king as a “great nationalist” and also following Cambodia’s constitution it says he’s the symbol of “national unity”, “independence” and “sovereignty”.

The party believes that training for occupational and employment is necessary for “both male and female Cambodians in response to the needs of both local and international labour markets.” The SJP also believes that “Cambodian workers and people” need to be protected in other countries and in Cambodia.

It supports the “freedom” of the Cambodian people.

References

External links
Sangkum Yutethor Party/ Society of Justice Party website

2006 establishments in Cambodia
Cambodian democracy movements

Monarchist parties in Cambodia
Political parties established in 2006
Political parties in Cambodia